The Cerro Negro Formation is a sedimentary formation of Ediacaran age in Buenos Aires Province, Argentina. The formation crops out along the Tandilia System, a chain of hills made up by of ancient rocks. Together with the formations of the underlying Sierra Bayas Group it is contains the oldest sedimentary formations in Argentina that have not been subject to significant metamorphism or deformation. In 2015 a complete revision of the formation was proposed.

Fossil content 
Soft-bodied discoidal specimens resembling Aspidella are described from the formation, that has been estimated as not older than 565 Ma.

See also 

 Dyke swarms of Tandil and Azul
 Puncoviscana Formation
 Nama Group

References

Bibliography 
 
 

Geologic formations of Argentina
Ediacaran South America
Shale formations
Sandstone formations
Marl formations
Tidal deposits
Paleontology in Argentina
Geology of Buenos Aires Province